Smeed may refer to:

People
Smeed, Eben C. (1830-1892) an American civil engineer who was best known for his civil war work supporting Sherman's Atlanta and Savannah campaigns.
Smeed, George (1812- 1881) Sittingbourne entrepreneur supplying bricks to Victorian London.  
Smeed Cross, Katherine (1858-1943) was an American social leader in Kansas.
Smeed, Norah Lillian Emily (1900-1968) was a British actress of stage and screen.
Smeed, Reuben CBE (1909–1976) was a British statistician and transport researcher.

Other
Eliza Smeed (1867) the biggest barge ever launched in Kent,U.K. and rigged as a barquentine fitted with leeboards.
George Smeed a Thames barge built in 1882 by Smeed Dean & Co. Ltd. in Murston, U.K.
Smeed's Law, empirical rule relating traffic fatalities to traffic congestion.
Smeed Report, (1962-1964) a study into alternative methods of charging for road use, commissioned by the UK government.

See also